John Bernard 'Bernie' Martin (1909-1991) was an Australian rugby league player who played in the 1930s and 1940s.

Playing career
A St. George local junior from Arncliffe, New South Wales, Martin was graded at St. George as a winger in 1930.  He played five seasons with St. George : 1930,1933-1934 and 1937–1938. Martin played in the 1933 Final in which the Dragons were runners-up to Newtown on 9 September 1933. 

He also played for South Sydney between 1935–1936, and finished his career at Canterbury-Bankstown in 1940. Bernie Martin's brother, Edward Martin, also played with him at St. George  in 1933.

Death
Martin died on 13 April 1991, aged 81.

References

St. George Dragons players
South Sydney Rabbitohs players
Canterbury-Bankstown Bulldogs players
1991 deaths
1909 births
Rugby league wingers
Rugby league players from Sydney